Deflorita is a genus of Asian bush crickets of the tribe Mirolliini (subfamily Phaneropterinae).

Records for species distributions include: Sri Lanka, China, Taiwan, Indo-China and western Malesia (including Borneo).

Species
The Orthoptera Species File list:
Deflorita apicalis Shiraki, 1930
Deflorita argentata Ingrisch, 1998
Deflorita bella Gorochov, 2008
Deflorita centa Shi & Chang, 2004
Deflorita curva Shi & Chang, 2004
Deflorita decora Gorochov, 2008
Deflorita deflorita Brunner von Wattenwyl, 1878 - type species (as Exora deflorita)
Deflorita forceps Gorochov, 2004
Deflorita hemilyra Gorochov, 2004
Deflorita integra Ingrisch, 1998
Deflorita lyra Gorochov, 2004
Deflorita marginata Ingrisch, 2011
Deflorita parallela Gorochov, 2004
Deflorita paralyra Gorochov, 2008
Deflorita protecta Ingrisch, 2011
Deflorita pulchra Gorochov, 2008
Deflorita unicolor Karny, 1926

References

External links

Tettigoniidae genera
Phaneropterinae
Orthoptera of Asia